African Centre for Technology Studies (ACTS) is an intergovernmental non-profit organization, founded in 1988 by Calestous Juma   in Nairobi, Kenya, promoting policy-oriented research on science and technology in development that is sustainable in terms of the economy, society, and the environment. It was the first African non-profit organization to combine policy research, science and technology.

History
Founded in 1988, ACTS was a pioneer in development research on innovative development policies related to applied science, technology, and innovation.

ACTS research influenced policies on industrial property legislation and policy in Kenya, environmental impact assessment standards in Eastern and Southern Africa,  biofuels and bio-energy in Kenya, Eastern and West Africa. ACTS has also influenced policies across Africa on issues such as climate change adaptation and mitigation, agriculture, biotechnology, biodiplomacy, and biosafety.

Affiliations
ACTS is a member of the Global Partnership for Sustainable Development Data (GPSDD),  which includes 150 data producers and users working towards sustainable development focusing on data that informs research ending extreme poverty and addressing climate change. The Canadian, Colombian, French, Ghanaian, Italian, Mexican, Moroccan, Nigerian, Philippine, Senagalese, United Kingdom and United States' governments are member-states of the network.

Awards
In 2013, ACTS was named as one of the top Environment Think Tanks globally. In 1991 the Council for the Development of Social Science Research in Africa (CODESRIA) honored ACTS for its contribution to expanding the knowledge base for development in Africa with the Justinian Rweyemamu Prize, named after Tanzania’s first major economics scholar, Justinian Rweyemamu.

Community-based actions
ACTS policy researchers engage with local communities to encourage communities to reflect on and learn from their own coping mechanisms when faced with flood-prone areas. They then choose best practice adaptations and develop long-term proactive strategies for flood mitigation which might include crop diversification.

Selected publications
ACTS published the groundbreaking study by Harvard professor, Calestous Juma and J. B. Ojwang entitled Innovation and Sovereignty: The Patent Debate in African Development. Juma directs the  Harvard Kennedy School's (HKS) Agricultural Innovation in Africa Project funded by the Bill and Melinda Gates Foundation.

In his 1993 article, in which he examined legal processes regarding access and tenurial issues in regards to group and individual pastoral natural resource management in Turkana in Kenya, focusing on tree rights, Edmund G.C. Barrow made a case for indigenous property rights.

References

Ochieng, C. (2007). Development through positive deviance and its implications for economic policy making and public administration in Africa: the case of Kenya agricultural development, 1930-2004. World Development 35: (3) 454–479.

Ochieng, C. (2007) Re-vitalizing African agriculture through innovative business and organizational arrangements: promising developments in the traditional crops sector. Journal of Modern African Studies 45 :( 1) 143-169.

Ochieng, C. (2007) The EU-ACP economic partnership agreements and the development question: opportunities and constraints posed by Article XXIV and special and differential treatment provisions of the WTO. Journal of International Economic Law 10: (2) 363-395.

Ochieng, C & Houdet, J. (2015) eds. Responsible Exploitation of Natural Resources for African Development. ACTS Special Issue Paper Series 001. ACTS Press, Nairobi

External links 
 ACTS website

Non-profit organisations based in Kenya
International development in Africa
Sustainable development
Sustainability and environmental management